Jamin Elliott (born October 5, 1979) is a former American football wide receiver. He was drafted by the Chicago Bears in the sixth round in 2002 NFL Draft. He played college football at Delaware. With the New England Patriots, he won Super Bowl XXXVIII over the Carolina Panthers.

In 2006, Elliott was convinced by former Delaware teammate Matt Nagy to join him on the Georgia Force of the Arena Football League. That year, he caught 66 passes for 745 yards and 12 touchdowns for the Force.

References

External links
New England Patriots bio

1979 births
Living people
Sportspeople from Portsmouth, Virginia
American football wide receivers
Delaware Fightin' Blue Hens football players
Chicago Bears players
New England Patriots players
Georgia Force players
Atlanta Falcons players
Cologne Centurions (NFL Europe) players
Players of American football from Virginia
Players of American football from Chicago